Abras is a surname of French origin. It can be traced back to the 16th century in France. Notable people with the surname include:

Caroline Abras (born 1987), Brazilian actress
Juan Manuel Abras (born 1975), Swedish classical music composer, conductor, musicologist, and historian

References

Surnames
Surnames of French origin
French-language surnames